Olubo or Lolubo is a Central Sudanic language spoken by 15.000 Olubo people in Southern Sudan

References

Languages of South Sudan
Moru-Madi languages